The 2021–22 Purdue Fort Wayne Mastodons men's basketball team represented Purdue University Fort Wayne in the 2021–22 NCAA Division I men's basketball season. The Mastodons, led by eighth-year head coach Jon Coffman, played their home games at the Hilliard Gates Sports Center in Fort Wayne, Indiana, as members of the Horizon League. They finished the regular season 21–11, 15–6 to earn a share of the regular season championship. As the No. 2 seed in the Horizon League tournament, they defeated UIC in the quarterfinals before losing to Northern Kentucky in the semifinals. They received a bid to the College Basketball Invitational, where they lost to top seed Drake in the first round.

Previous season
In a season limited due to the ongoing COVID-19 pandemic, the Mastodons finished the 2020–21 season 8–15, 6–14 in Horizon League play to finish in 11th place. In the Horizon League tournament, they defeated Green Bay in the first round before losing to Cleveland State in the quarterfinals.

Offseason

Departures

Incoming transfers

Roster

Schedule and results

|-
!colspan=12 style=| Exhibition

|-
!colspan=12 style=|Regular season

|-
!colspan=9 style=| Horizon League tournament

|-
!colspan=9 style=| CBI

|-

Source

References

Purdue Fort Wayne Mastodons men's basketball seasons
Purdue Fort Wayne Mastodons
Purdue Fort Wayne Mastodons men's basketball
Purdue Fort Wayne Mastodons men's basketball
Purdue Fort Wayne